Khanderao Ballal , popularly known as ‘Khando Ballal Chitnis’, was a diplomat in Maharashtra during the late 17th century and the early 18th century. He was also the personal Assistant of Rajaram and Shahu. He is remembered for his support of Rajaram Maharaj as well as his support for Sambhaji Maharaj. There is a story that Sambhaji Maharaj had gone to war in Goa, but his horse started suddenly drowning in a river, but Khanadoballal  chitnis bravely got off his horse and saved the Chhatrapati.

Early life
Khando Ballal was born around 1660 in a  Chandraseniya Kayastha Prabhu family. His father, Ballal Avaji Chitnis, popularly known as ‘Balaji Avaji’, was the chitnis (Secretary) of Shivaji from 1658 to 1680. Balaji Avaji's original surname was Chitre. However, after being appointed as the personal assistant of Shivaji, the family started using Chitnis as the surname. 

Under the regime of Sambhaji, Balaji Avaji was executed by Sambhaji because he was framed for conspiring and trying to poison the Maharaj with some other ministers. Thereafter, on Queen Yesubai's advice, Khando Ballal was appointed to take up the vacant post of his father in 1681.

Contribution
Khando Ballal worked as chtinis for about 8 years until Sambhaji was captured and put to death by Aurangzeb in 1689.
After Sambhaji’s execution, Ramchandra Pant Amatya secretly sent Chhatrapati Rajaram to fort Gingee to divert attention of the Mughal army. Khando Ballal was one of the few who accompanied Rajaram in this hazardous journey. 
After reaching Gingee, with the help of Pralhad Niraji, Khando Ballal made tremendous efforts in finding out the diplomats and warriors those were vanished in the way and gathering them back. 
He also conspired with Ramchandra Pant Amatya to secretly move Queens of Rajaram from Maharashtra to Gingee with the help of his maternal uncles Lingoji Shankar and Visaji Shankar Tungare. 
For the  performance shown during the tough times at Gingee, Rajaram gave him the vatan of Dabhol in the konkan area of Maharashtra.

Conspiracy for Rajaram’s Escape
In the early 1698, when the Mughal army had surrounded fort Gingee and was prepared for the final blow, Maharani Yesubai designed a plot for the escape of Rajaram. He, however, kept his word and helped Rajaram to escape from the blockade and to hand him over to the troops under Maratha General Dhanaji Jadhav by giving up his Dabhol Vatan to Ganoji Shirkhe.

Later life and death
Until the death of Rajaram in 1700, Khando Ballal worked with him not only as his personal assistant but also as an adviser in confidence.
After Rajaram's death, Khando Ballal continued his post as advised by Queen Tarabai until 1707.
On release of Shahu after the death of Aurangzeb in 1707, Khando Ballal was invited by Shahu to join his hands. Having sincerely felt that Shahu was the rightful and eligible heir of the throne of Maratha Empire rather than Shivaji II, he accepted Shahu’s invitation. Until his death, he worked as personal assistant and senior member of the Advisory Committee of Shahu and attained great respect and honor. 
When Shahu became wild on the so-called betrayal by Parshuram Pant Pratinidhi, one of the great diplomats and warriors of the Maratha Empire, he ordered to arrest him at once and smash his eyes. When came to know about this, Khando Ballal ran to Shahu’s court and requested him to stop this nonsense. He then reprimanded Shahu for such an unfair deal with the great contributor of the Maratha Empire like Parshuram Pant. Shahu realized his mistake. He immediately released Parshuram Pant, apologized to him, and bestowed his honor back. 
Soon after this episode, Khando Ballal died probably in 1712.

Legacy Of Khandoballal
Khandoballal Chitnis's great-grandson wrote the Chitnis Bakhar which went on to become one of the historically most important Sources of information on the 6 Chhatrapatis. He even wrote the Shiva Digvijaya.

References

Marathi Riyasat Volume I & II (Marathi) by Govind Sakharam Sardesai
Shejwalkar Lekh Sangrah(Marathi) by T S Shejwalkar

People of the Maratha Empire
History of Maharashtra